This list of sequenced archaeal genomes contains all the archaea known to have publicly available complete genome sequences that have been assembled, annotated and deposited in public databases. Methanococcus jannaschii was the first archaeon whose genome was sequenced, in 1996.

Currently in this list there are 39 genomes belonging to Crenarchaeota species, 105 belonging to the Euryarchaeota, 1 genome belonging to Korarchaeota and to the Nanoarchaeota, 3 belonging to the Thaumarchaeota and 1 genome belonging to an unclassified Archaea, totalling 150 Archaeal genomes.

Crenarchaeota

Acidilobales

Desulforococcales

Sulfolobales

Thermoproteales

Euryarchaeota

Archaeoglobi

Halobacteria

Methanobacteria

Methanococci

Methanomicrobia

Methanopyri

Thermococci

Thermoplasmata

Unclassified Euryarchaeota

Korarchaeota

Nanoarchaeota

Thaumarchaeota

Cenarchaeales

Nitrosopumilales

Unclassified Archaea

See also 
Genome project
Human microbiome project
Lists of sequenced genomes

References

External links 
GOLD:Genomes OnLine Database v 2.0
SUPERFAMILY comparative genomics database Includes genomes of completely sequenced archaea, and sophisticated datamining plus visualisation tools for analysis

Archaea biology
Archaeal
Biology-related lists